4th Vitranc Cup was an alpine skiing competition, held between 27 and 28 February 1965 in Kranjska Gora, SR Slovenia, Yugoslavia. They were hosting two FIS 1A international events.

Official results

Giant slalom 
On 27 February, the longest giant slalom in history of Vitranc Cup with vertical drop at 590 metres was held.

Slalom 
On 28 February, slalom was held on »Bedanc« (1st) and »Vitranc« (2nd) courses with vertical drop at 180 metres.

References

External links
 

International sports competitions hosted by Yugoslavia
1965 in Yugoslav sport
International sports competitions hosted by Slovenia
Alpine skiing competitions
Alpine skiing in Slovenia
1965 in Slovenia

sl:4. Pokal Vitranc (1965)